Robert G. L. Leonori (December 1, 1820 – July 25, 1905) was an American artist. Born in New York, he was a member of the American Art-Union  and associated with the Hudson River School of landscape painters.

Leonori painted both landscapes and still-lives but he is best known for scenes of the Hudson River Valley, Niagara Falls and the Catskill region of New York state.  His work was regularly exhibited at the American Art-Union from 1846 to 1852. An 1848 distribution record shows that five of his paintings had been distributed by the American Art-Union by 1848, a high proportion compared to other artists.

The artist appears to have lived in NY all his life. His name is recorded in connection with the Broadway Tabernacle Church in 1844.  New York city directories and censuses show that Leonori lived in various locations in the city from 1871 to 1891.

Robert Leonori's wife, née Margaret S. Hatfield, was a descendant of the Hatfield Family of Elizabeth, NJ. The couple married in Essex, New York, on 8 May 1841 with the marriage register showing that the artist was a NY resident in that year.

Robert Leonori died in 1905 in New York. He is buried at Brooklyn's historic Green-Wood Cemetery.

Leonori's works have rarely appeared at auctions. In 2000, his Seascape - Bull's Creek, New Jersey fetched $6,325 with Buyer's Premium, at Christies NY, while a view of Niagara Falls, fetched $3,000 (Lot 188) on 14 December 2005 at Sotheby's NY.

A descendant of Robert G. Leonori, Barbara Peterson (second time great granddaughter) donated works by the artist in 2014 to the Mountainside Restoration Committee responsible for Deacon Andrew Hetfield House, Union County, New Jersey.

Sources

References 

1820 births
1905 deaths
19th-century American painters
Hudson River School painters
American male painters
American landscape painters
Artists from New York (state)
Burials at Green-Wood Cemetery
19th-century American male artists